Reginald Leslie Hine (25 September 1883 – 14 April 1949) FSA, FRHS was a solicitor and historian whose writings centred on the market-town of Hitchin in Hertfordshire and its environs. He committed suicide in 1949 by jumping in front of a train at Hitchin railway station when facing disciplinary proceedings from The Law Society.

Early years
Hine was born in 1883 at Newnham Hall near Baldock in Hertfordshire, the son of Alderman Joseph Neville Hine (1849–1931), a tenant farmer, and his wife Eliza Taylor (1843–1892). Hine was educated at Grove House in Baldock, was privately tutored by the Revd George Todd of Baldock, and attended Kent College in Canterbury and The Leys School in Cambridge.

Minsden Chapel

In 1907 Hine and two others, the Hitchin photographer Thomas William Latchmore (1882–1946) and the artist and etcher F. L. Griggs, took a camera to Minsden Chapel with the intention of photographing the ghost of a monk who it was believed had been murdered there and whose spirit was said to emerge from the stone walls of the ruined chapel. Hine claimed that they had been successful and published the resulting photograph in his The History of Hitchin. The photograph is now accepted as having been a practical joke at best, and a hoax at worst.

Hine frequently visited the chapel, and eventually obtained a lifetime lease from the vicars of Hitchin. So fond of the building was he, that he even bade "trespassers and sacrilegious persons take warning, for I will proceed against them with the utmost rigour of the law, and, after my death and burial, I will endeavour, in all ghostly ways, to protect and haunt its hallowed walls".

Solicitor and historian
Hine studied law and became an articled clerk aged 18, working for the long-established firm of Hawkins and Company of Hitchin, but despite his claims to the contrary he did not qualify as a solicitor until he was 50 in 1933. He then went into partnership with local solicitor Reginald Hartley, and for the remaining 16 years of his life practised with the firm of Hartley and Hine until his sudden retirement on 31 March 1949, just two weeks before his death.

In 1910 he delivered a lecture on the history of The Manor of Newnham, where he had been born 27 years earlier.

He was one of the founders of Hitchin Museum which houses many of his own documents. An unenthusiastic solicitor, Hine's first love was the study of the history of his home area. He wrote a number of volumes on the history of Hitchin and its environs, including his The History of Hitchin (1929) and Hitchin Worthies (1932), which won national acclaim. In 1934 he was commissioned to write the History of Stagenhoe.

Historian W. G. Hoskins described Hine's The History of Hitchin as "first class", while Professor G. M. Trevelyan said "I have nothing but admiration for the method, plan and style of it". However, others were not so enthusiastic about Hine's works, questioning his use of sources and historical accuracy, further claiming that Hine would often stretch the facts to make a good story.

Personal life
Hine married Florence Lee Pyman (b. 1888/9) on 11 April 1912 in Hampstead and their daughter Felicity was born in 1915.

Hine was judged unfit for military service during World War I and he and his family moved to Hitchin in 1917 and to nearby Willian in 1929. In the same year Hine was elected a Fellow of the Society of Antiquaries of London. In 1930 he was elected a Fellow of the Royal Historical Society.

Death

Hine suffered from depression in his later years, and in Confessions of an Uncommon Attorney (1946) he acknowledged that "the strain of leading a double life, the accumulation of office worries, and the burden of clients’ woes had worn me down". 

He committed suicide in 1949 by jumping in front of a train at Hitchin railway station. At the time of his death Hine faced being struck off as a solicitor for professional misconduct, having contacted both sides in a divorce case contrary to Law Society rules. He left behind 60 boxes of material for his planned History of Hertfordshire.

Hine was cremated at Golders Green Crematorium on 19 April 1949, at the same time that his memorial service was being held at St Mary's Church in Hitchin. His ashes were scattered at Minsden Chapel.

After Death
Hine's last book, Relics of an Uncommon Attorney, a collection of his later writings, was published posthumously by his friend Richenda Scott. Hitchin Historical Society has been awarding the Reginald Hine Award since 1979.

A biography, The Ghosts of Reginald Hine: An Uncommon Attorney, by Richard Whitmore, was published in 2007.

Bibliography

 Anima Celtica (1912)
 Dreams and the Way of Dreams (1913)
 Hitchin Priory (1919)
 The Cream of Curiosity, George Routledge, London (1920)
 The History of Hitchin, George Allen & Unwin (2 volumes) 1927–1929
 Samuel Lucas, His Life and Art Work, Walkers Galleries Ltd (1928)
 A Mirror for the Society of Friends: Being the Story of the Hitchin Quakers (1929 – revised 1930)
 A Short Story of St Mary's, Hitchin, Paternoster & Hales, Hitchin (1930, 4th edition 1946)
 History of Hitchin Grammar School (1931)
 The Official Guide to Hitchin (1932)
 Hitchin Worthies, Allen & Unwin, London (1932)
 The History of Stagenhoe (1934)
 The Natural History of The Hitchin Region (1934)
 The Story of Methodism at Hitchin (1934)
 The Story of the Sun Hotel (1937)
 The Story of Hitchin Town, Wm. Carling & Co, Hitchin (~1938, later reprints)
 Confessions of an Un-Common Attorney (1945)
 Hitchin Old and New: Fifty Photographs and Drawings (1946)
 The Hitchin Countryside: Photographs and Drawings (1946)
 Charles Lamb and His Hertfordshire, J M Dent, London (1949)
 Relics of an Un-Common Attorney, Dent, London (1951)

References

1883 births
1949 suicides
Hitchin
People from Baldock
People from Hitchin
People educated at Kent College
People educated at The Leys School
English solicitors
Historians of Hertfordshire
Golders Green Crematorium
20th-century English lawyers
1949 deaths
Suicides by train
Suicides in England